Christopher P. Granner (born 1957 in Mt. Kisco, New York) is a freelance music composer, best known for composing music for video games and pinball games.

Career and biography
Granner's father is organist/pianist, so he was interested in music since his childhood. He studied composition and computer sound/music at University of Illinois at Urbana–Champaign under prolific musicians Ben Johnston, Herbert Brün, Salvatore Martirano and Scott Wyatt. After finishing university with a Bachelor of Music and a Master of Fine Arts in music composition he moved to Evanston-located Northwestern University's music lab. There Granner heard that Williams Electronics (which evolved in Midway Games) was looking for composer, and he took the job and became leading composer in coin-op and pinball industry. After leaving Midway Granner set up his own sound production studio CGMusic and produced music and sound for many video games, advertisements and pinball games.

From 2006 to 2011, Granner had retired from composing music for games, after he was finished with Stern / Steve Ritchie Productions' pinball, World Poker Tour. In 2011, Granner came out of retirement and joined the newly formed Jersey Jack Pinball, where he served as the composer and audio director for their first pinball game, The Wizard of Oz. In April 2012, Granner began audio work with Spooky Cool Labs, a Chicago-based startup company developing social games for Facebook and mobile platforms. He joined Spooky Cool, in-house, as Audio Director in October 2012. In June 2013, Spooky Cool was acquired by Zynga; Granner is currently serving as Audio Director of that studio, now known as Zynga Chicago, which produces games for the Hit It Rich! social casino.

Granner's Works
Note: The titles shown are in chronological order.

Pinball

Williams
Road Kings (pinball) (with Bill Parod)
Millionaire
Pin*Bot (with Bill Parod)
F-14 Tomcat (with Steve Ritchie and Bill Parod)
Fire! (with Rich Karstens)
Big Guns
Cyclone
Taxi
Jokerz! (with Jon Hey)
Earthshaker! (with Jon Hey)
Police Force
Whirlwind
Diner
FunHouse (with Jon Hey)
Terminator 2: Judgment Day
Fish Tales
Whitewater
Indiana Jones: The Pinball Adventure (with Rich Karstens)
Red & Ted's Road Show

Midway (Bally)
Truck Stop
Elvira and the Party Monsters
Dr. Dude And His Excellent Ray (with Jon Hey)
The Addams Family
The Twilight Zone (with Rich Karstens)
Indianapolis 500

Capcom
Pinball Magic (with Jeff Powell)
Airborne
The Pit and the Pendulum
Kingpin

Stern
Monopoly
RollerCoaster Tycoon(PLD)
The Simpsons Pinball Party (with Dan Forden)(Keith P. Johnson, Joe Balcer)
Terminator 3: Rise of the Machines (SRP)
The Lord of the Rings(George Gomez)
Ripley's Believe It or Not!(PLD)
Elvis(SRP)
The Sopranos(George Gomez)
NASCAR (released as Grand Prix in Europe)(PLD)
World Poker Tour(SRP)

Jersey Jack Pinball
 The Wizard of Oz (with Rob Berry)
The names in superscript are the designers from the pinball machine, PLD stands for Pat Lawlor Design, SRP stands for Steve Ritchie Productions

Video games

Williams
Joust 2: Survival of the Fittest

Midway
Trog
Strike Force
Terminator 2: Judgment Day
Revolution X
WWF WrestleMania

Electronic Arts
Super Baseball 2020 (with Brian L. Schmidt; Sega Genesis version)

Atari Games
California Speed

Incredible Technologies
Golden Tee Fore!

Microsoft
Tao Feng: Fist of the Lotus (developed by Studio Gigante)

THQ
WWE WrestleMania 21 (developed by Studio Gigante)

Zynga
Wizard of Oz social adventure-sim game (developed by Spooky Cool Labs; now inactive)
Hit It Rich! social casino

References

External links
CGMusic: Chris Granner's Music Production Studio
PinballSounds.com Interview
Soundtrack of Millionaire

1958 births
American male composers
Freelance musicians
Kodaikanal International School alumni
Living people
Musicians from Chicago
Pinball game designers
Video game composers